The Gordini Type 17S was a sports car prototype, designed, developed, and built by French manufacturer Gordini, in 1953.

Development history and technology
The Type 17S remained a one-off. It was Amédée Gordini's attempt to enter the small-capacity racing classes with a racing car. At that time, however, the classes from 0.6 to 1.1 liters were already occupied by Panhard, Monopole, and Deutsch & Bonnet, who had a great deal of experience with these small racing vehicles. The car had a Spyder body and a 1.1-liter straight-4 engine. Today the vehicle is part of the Schlumpf collection.

Racing history
The car was driven at the 24-hour race of Le Mans in 1954 by the two Belgians André Pilette and Gilberte Thirion, who had to give up after ignition damage in the eleventh hour of the race. Another outing at Le Mans in 1956 by Charles de Clareur and André Milhoux also ended in failure.

References

Sports racing cars
1950s cars
Cars of France